Anthoney Hill (born December 24, 1971) is a former American football and Canadian football quarterback in the Canadian Football League who played for the Edmonton Eskimos. He played college football for the Colorado State Rams. He was the Director of Player Development & Community/Alumni Relations for Colorado State.

References

1971 births
Living people
American football quarterbacks
Canadian football quarterbacks
Edmonton Elks players
Colorado State Rams football players